The 1925 Cincinnati Bearcats football team was an American football team that represented the University of Cincinnati as a member of the Ohio Athletic Conference (OAC) during 1925 college football season. In its fourth season under head coach George McLaren, the team compiled a 4–5 record (2–3 against OAC opponents).

Schedule

References

Cincinnati
Cincinnati Bearcats football seasons
Cincinnati Bearcats football